Libellula doris is an extinct species of dragonflies, commonly called skimmers, in the family Libellulidae. Larvae of these insects have been found in the Miocene of Germany, France and Italy.

References
 O. Heer. 1849. Die Insektenfauna der Tertiärgebilde von Oeningen und von Radoboj in Croatien. Zweiter Theil: Henschrecken, Florfliegen, Aderflügler, Schmetterlinge und Fliegen 1-264
 The Paleobiology Database
 Universal Biological Indexer
 Enlciclopaedia of Life

Libellulidae